Iñapari may refer to:
 Iñapari, a Peruvian village
 Iñapari District, in Peru
 Iñapari language, spoken in Peru